DC Omnibus is a line of large format, high quality, full color, hardcover editions published by DC Comics since 2007, reprinting comics previously printed in single issue format. Individual volumes tend to focus on collecting either the works of prolific comic creators, like Jack Kirby and Steve Ditko; major comic book events like "Blackest Night" and "Infinite Crisis"; complete series or runs like Gotham Central and Grayson or chronological reprints of the earliest years of stories featuring the company's most well-known series and characters like Batman and Justice League of America.

Golden, Silver and Bronze Age volumes
In 2013, DC began collecting the earliest stories of some its most enduring series and characters in matching trade dress volumes, titled Golden Age Omnibus, Silver Age Omnibus and Bronze Age Omnibus, replacing the earlier lines Showcase Presents, DC Archive Editions and DC Chronicles. Each Age Omnibus volume is also published as two or three (depending on page count) trade paperbacks.

The final volumes in their respective titles are indicated with a double-dagger.

Modern Age volumes

Vertigo volumes

See also 

 Marvel Omnibus
 List of comic books on CD/DVD
 Omnibus edition
 List of DC Comics reprint collections

References

External links
Comic Book Herald – The Completely Insane & Utterly Comprehensive DC Omnibus & Absolute Edition Guide
DCcomics.com – Omnibus
BleedingCool.com – 12 New Omnibuses from DC Comics in 2019
ComicBookWire – All Upcoming DC Omnibus Editions (now until June 2020)

Reprint collections
Comic book collection books